The Canadian Northern Railway Bridge is a Canadian railway bridge that spans the North Saskatchewan River in Prince Albert, Saskatchewan.

Overview 

The bridge was built by the Canadian Northern Railway between 1907 and 1909 with the superstructure supplied by the Hamilton Bridge Company.  Originally designed as a joint railway and road bridge the bridge consisted of a centre rail line with  extensions on each side for traffic. These traffic lanes remained in use until 1960 when the nearby Diefenbaker Bridge opened. The layout of the bridge consisted of three  steel trusses, a  swing span truss and two additional  fixed trusses.  The centre swing span was used to permit the passage of steamboats on the river and movement of logs until 1918 when the downstream sawmill shut down operations and a dam was constructed downstream in 1937.  In 1939 the Department of Transport granted the railway permission to convert the moveable span into a fixed span.

See also 
 List of crossings of the North Saskatchewan River
 List of bridges in Canada
 List of road-rail bridges

References

Buildings and structures in Prince Albert, Saskatchewan
Canadian National Railway bridges in Canada
Railway bridges in Saskatchewan
Bridges completed in 1909
Bridges over the North Saskatchewan River
Transport in Prince Albert, Saskatchewan